Saint-Germain-le-Gaillard may refer to the following communes in France:

Saint-Germain-le-Gaillard, Eure-et-Loir, in the Eure-et-Loir  département
Saint-Germain-le-Gaillard, Manche, in the Manche  département